Omnitracker is a proprietary business process platform developed by Omninet GmbH in Germany. Omnitracker is developed as modular software for medium and large companies. It is used to track, control and evaluate relevant business processes. The main area of application is the support of ITIL compliant processes, which manages requests, incidents/ errors, customer inquiries from the moment of creation to completion. Omnitracker received certifications of the Federal Association of IT-Mittelstand  and Pink Elephant that covers nine processes.

History 
Omnitracker was developed by the privately owned company Omninet GmbH, based in Eckental located close to Nuremberg in 1998. Initially Omninet's focus was on quality management and software development processes. Omnitracker has since expanded across industries and modularly for business process platforms. In 2000, the focus on service management processes according to ITIL has been implemented in the Omnitracker. Numerous international clients  use Omnitracker as mission-critical system in different service and technical processes. 
Omnitracker 2012 has been classified by the analyst group, Info-Tech Research Group as a 'Value Champion' software.

Orientation 
The Omnitracker platform and applications serve as a far-reaching automation of IT-based workflows and are aimed at B2B customers in all industries such as Industrial companies, service organizations, IT service providers and government agencies. Overall Omnitracker is used by several hundred installations. Notable clients are DB (German Railways), DATEV, Daimler, the German Patent and Trademark Office, SANYO, Siemens, tesa, NATO, Belgian Defence.

Development and sales 
The system development and the international support are operated exclusively in the parent company located in Eckental Germany. Sales are made directly through Omninet and via Omninet's partners.

Functions 
The multitenant Omnitracker platform consists of a base system, modular base components and clients. 
Unlimited user-specific extensions can be configured and controlled via open interfaces. The system has its own graphical workflow editor; rule-based notifications and escalations. The data model as well as the rights and role concept are freely configurable. Reports and statistics can also be automated.

Individual modules 
Currently Omnitracker has 12 business process platform based applications, IT Service Management Center V3 (ITSM) - for control of ITIL-compliant IT service management processes and customer service processes, Project Management Center - Project Planning and Control, Stock & Order Management - support the ordering and delivery process, Contract Management Center - to support contract management and Systems Engineering Center - management of software development processes (ALM).

Licensing 
The licensing model is modular for the basic server components and concurrent based on (simultaneous) users. Additional to the classic license purchase, an optional license renting and a pay-per-use model (depending on actual usage time) is provided.

References

External links 
 Official website

Workflow applications
Integrated development environments
ITIL
System administration
Network management